Koning Willem III School te Batavia was an elite school in the Dutch East Indies which operated from 1860 to 1942 at the 5-year Hogere Burgerschool level and with an extra component for training officers and civil servants for the colonial service. Among its students were a number of key members of the Indonesian National Awakening including Agus Salim, Achmad Djajadiningrat, Mohammad Husni Thamrin, Ernest Douwes Dekker, and Johannes Latuharhary.

1860 establishments in the Dutch East Indies
Educational institutions established in 1860
Schools in the Dutch East Indies
1942 disestablishments in the Dutch East Indies